The president of the Republic of Namibia is the head of state and the head of government of Namibia. The president directs the executive branch of the Government of Namibia, as chair of the Cabinet and is the commander-in-chief of the armed forces, according to the Constitution of Namibia.

List of officeholders 
Political parties

Timeline

Latest election

See also
Namibia
Politics of Namibia
List of colonial governors of South West Africa
Vice-President of Namibia
Prime Minister of Namibia
Cabinet of Namibia
Lists of office-holders

References

External links
World Statesmen – Namibia

Government of Namibia
Namibia
 
Presidents